Adam Jones may refer to:

Characters
 Adam Jones, the main character in the film  Burnt
 Adam Jones, a character in the TV series Between

People
 Adam Jones (American football) (born 1983), also known as Pacman Jones, retired NFL cornerback
 Adam Jones (baseball) (born 1985), baseball outfielder
 Adam Jones (racing driver) (born 1980), English auto racing driver
 Adam Jones (rugby union, born 1981), Wales and British Lions international rugby union prop
 Adam Jones (rugby union, born 1980), Wales international rugby union lock
 Adam Jones (musician) (born 1965), guitarist for the progressive metal band Tool
 Adam Jones (Canadian scholar) (born 1963), political scientist, writer, and photojournalist
 Adam Jones (lacrosse) (born 1989), Canadian lacrosse player
 Adam Garnet Jones, Canadian filmmaker and screenwriter

Other uses
 The Adam Jones Show, sports radio talk show host on WBZ-FM, Boston, Massachusetts